Benjamin Dreyfuss (born 1986) is an American journalist and actor. He is most known for his work at Mother Jones, his performance as young Bernie Madoff in ABC's 2016 miniseries, and his charitable works on behalf of children's blindness. He is the elder son of actors Richard Dreyfuss and Jeramie Rain, and the nephew of actor Lorin Dreyfuss and the cousin of actress Natalie Dreyfuss.

Early life 
Dreyfuss was born in 1986 to actors Richard Dreyfuss and Jeramie Rain. In his first year of life, he underwent 23 eye operations, including two corneal transplants, for Peters' anomaly, a rare genetic eye disorder. Eventually, Dreyfuss lost all sight in his left eye.

Filmography

Film

References

External links 

1986 births
Living people
21st-century American Jews
21st-century American male actors
American Ashkenazi Jews
American male film actors
American male journalists
Jewish American male actors
Mother Jones (magazine) people
Place of birth missing (living people)